

Olympics

National Hockey League
Art Ross Trophy as the NHL's leading scorer during the regular season: 
Hart Memorial Trophy: for the NHL's Most Valuable Player: 
Stanley Cup - Detroit Red Wings defeat the Washington Capitals in the 1998 Stanley Cup Finals
 The Tampa Bay Lightning selected Vincent Lecavalier with the first pick overall in the 1998 NHL Draft. The expansion Nashville Predators participated in the Draft for the first time, choosing David Legwand as the first-ever pick in franchise history.

Canadian Hockey League
Ontario Hockey League: The Guelph Storm captured the J. Ross Robertson Cup.
Quebec Major Junior Hockey League: The  won the President's Cup (QMJHL)  
Western Hockey League: The   won the President's Cup (WHL)  
Memorial Cup: The Spokane Chiefs served as host team for the 1998 Memorial Cup, which was won by the Portland Winter Hawks.

International hockey

European hockey

Women's hockey

Minor League hockey

Junior A hockey

Season articles

Deaths

See also
1998 in sports

References